Manuel Salamanca (29 July 1927 – 5 October 2010) was a Chilean footballer. He played in three matches for the Chile national football team in 1949. He was also part of Chile's squad for the 1949 South American Championship.

References

External links
 

1927 births
2010 deaths
Chilean footballers
Chile international footballers
Place of birth missing
Association football midfielders
Magallanes footballers